The equestrian events at the 1984 Los Angeles Olympics included show jumping, dressage and eventing.

The equestrian sports were held primarily at Santa Anita Racetrack, which offered stabling for up to 2100 horses, a grandstand with almost 16000 seats, and was managed by experienced horsemen. Fairbanks Ranch Country Club in San Diego County hosted the endurance portions of the three-day event.

Horses were required to be at least six years old. Up to 14 riders and 22 horses were permitted per country. In total 157 entries from thirty nations (Argentina, Australia, Austria, Belgium, Bermuda, Brazil, Canada, Chile, Denmark, Ecuador, Finland, France, the Federal Republic of Germany (FRG), Great Britain, Guatemala, Ireland, Italy, Japan, Mexico, the Netherlands, New Zealand, Norway, Peru, Puerto Rico, Spain, Sweden, Switzerland, the United States, the Virgin Islands, and Yugoslavia) competed.

Due to the boycott, the Soviet Union and its satellite nations were absent.

Medal summary

Medal table

Officials
Appointment of officials was as follows:

Dressage
  Donald Thackeray (Ground Jury President)
  Johanna Hall (Ground Jury Member)
  Wolfgang Niggli (Ground Jury Member)
  Elena Kondratieva (Ground Jury Member)
  Heinz Schütte (Ground Jury Member)

Jumping
  Knud Larsen (Ground Jury President)
  Eryk Brabec (Ground Jury Member)
  Jaap Rijks (Ground Jury Member)
  John Ammermann (Ground Jury Member)
  Bertalan de Nemethy (Course Designer)
  Arno Gego (Technical Delegate)

Eventing
  Anton Bühler (Ground Jury President)
  Jonathan Burton (Ground Jury Member)
  François Lucas (Ground Jury Member)
  Neil Ayer (Course Designer)
  Ewen B. Graham (Technical Delegate)

See also
 Equestrian at the Friendship Games

References

External links
 Official Olympic Report

 
1984 Summer Olympics events
1984 Summer Olympics
1984
Summer Olympics
1984 Summer Olympics